Dave's Picks Volume 33 is a three-CD live album by the rock band the Grateful Dead.  It contains the complete show recorded on October 29, 1977 at Evans Field House at Northern Illinois University in DeKalb, Illinois.  It was released on January 31, 2020, in a limited edition of 22,000 copies.

Dave's Picks Volume 33 was the 100th Grateful Dead album to be listed in the Billboard 200 weekly chart of the most popular albums in the United States.

Critical reception 
On AllMusic, Timothy Monger said, "On the second night of their fall 1977 tour, the Dead set up camp in Evans Field House for a lively show that grew in legend over the coming years among the tape-trading community.... Polished up from official soundboard tapes, Evans Field House is known by fans as a standout show from one of the band's best eras."

Track listing 
Disc 1
First set:
"Might as Well" (Jerry Garcia, Robert Hunter) – 6:43
"Jack Straw" (Bob Weir, Hunter) – 6:23
"Dire Wolf" (Garcia, Hunter) – 4:11
"Looks Like Rain" (Weir, John Perry Barlow) – 8:52
"Loser" (Garcia, Hunter) – 7:50
"El Paso" (Marty Robbins) – 4:48
"Ramble On Rose" (Garcia, Hunter) – 8:10
"New Minglewood Blues" (traditional, arranged by Grateful Dead) – 5:26
"It Must Have Been the Roses" (Hunter) – 7:33
"Let It Grow" (Weir, Barlow) – 12:41
Disc 2
Second set:
"Bertha" > (Garcia, Hunter) – 8:21
"Good Lovin'" (Rudy Clark, Artie Resnick) – 7:02
"Friend of the Devil" (Garcia, John Dawson, Hunter) – 9:31
Disc 3
Second set, continued:
"Estimated Prophet" > (Weir, Barlow)– 11:22
"Eyes of the World" > (Garcia, Hunter) – 13:10
"Space" > (Garcia, Phil Lesh, Weir) – 7:14
"St. Stephen" > (Garcia, Lesh, Hunter) – 11:12
"Not Fade Away" > (Norman Petty, Buddy Holly) – 7:37
"Black Peter" > (Garcia, Hunter) – 12:22
"Sugar Magnolia" (Weir, Hunter) – 10:06
Encore:
"One More Saturday Night" (Weir) – 5:23

Personnel 
Grateful Dead
Jerry Garcia – guitar, vocals
Donna Jean Godchaux – vocals
Keith Godchaux – keyboards
Mickey Hart – drums
Bill Kreutzmann – drums
Phil Lesh – bass, vocals
Bob Weir – guitar, vocals
Production
Produced by Grateful Dead
Produced for release by David Lemieux
Associate Producers: Ivette Ramos & Doran Tyson
Recording: Betty Cantor-Jackson
Mastering: Jeffrey Norman
Art direction, design: Steve Vance
Cover art: Dave Kloc
Photos: Patrick Harbron
Liner notes: David Lemieux

Charts

See also
List of 2020 albums

References 

33
Rhino Records live albums
2020 live albums